In enzymology, a malonate-semialdehyde dehydrogenase (acetylating) is an enzyme that catalyzes the chemical reaction

3-oxopropanoate + CoA + NAD(P)+  acetyl-CoA + CO2 + NAD(P)H

The 4 substrates of this enzyme are 3-oxopropanoate, CoA, NAD+, and NADP+, whereas its 4 products are acetyl-CoA, CO2, NADH, and NADPH.

This enzyme belongs to the family of oxidoreductases, specifically those acting on the aldehyde or oxo group of donor with NAD+ or NADP+ as acceptor.  The systematic name of this enzyme class is 3-oxopropanoate:NAD(P)+ oxidoreductase (decarboxylating, CoA-acetylating). This enzyme is also called malonic semialdehyde oxidative decarboxylase.  This enzyme participates in 4 metabolic pathways: inositol metabolism, alanine and aspartate metabolism, beta-alanine metabolism, and propanoate metabolism.

References

Further reading 

 
 
 

EC 1.2.1
NADPH-dependent enzymes
NADH-dependent enzymes
Enzymes of unknown structure